São Silvestre is a 2013 Brazilian documentary film directed by Lina Chamie, about the São Silvestre road race, the most prestigious open-pit race of Latin America, held annually in São Paulo, on 31 December. With a camera attached to the body of the actor Fernando Alves Pinto, the film seeks to capture the tiredness, the speed, the sweat, the breath and the movement of the athletes.

References

External links
 

Brazilian documentary films
2013 documentary films
2013 films
Films shot in São Paulo
Films set in São Paulo